The General Staff of the Armed Forces of the Republic of Belarus is the central body of military management and operational control of the Armed Forces of Belarus. The Chief of the General Staff is appointed by the President of Belarus, who is the Supreme Commander-in-Chief of the Armed Forces. The General Staff is part of the Ministry of Defence of Belarus.

The current Chief of the General Staff is Viktor Gulevich, who also serves as First Deputy Minister of Defence. His deputy is Major General Ruslan Kosygin.

Structure 
The following departments are under the control of the general staff:

 Main Operations Directorate
 Main Intelligence Directorate
 Main Organizational Mobilization Directorate
 Main Ideology Directorate
 Main Policy Directorate
 Information-Analytical Department
 Department of Communications
 Department of Territorial Defense
 Department of Missile Forces and Artillery
 Department of the Engineering Troops
 Financial Department
 Department of Electronic Warfare
 Department of Radiation, Chemical and Biological Protection 
 Navigational and Topographical Department

List of chiefs of the general staff

References 

Ministry of Defence (Belarus)
Belarus